Roope is a name. As a given name, Roope is the Finnish variant of Robert, while as a surname, it is an English occupational surname associated with rope makers or rope sellers.

Given name
Roope Ahonen (born 1990), Finnish basketball player 
Roope Gröndahl (born 1989), Finnish pianist
Roope Hämäläinen (born 1992), Finnish ice hockey player
Roope Hintz (born 1996), Finnish ice hockey player
Roope Jussila (1943 – 2013), Finnish Counselor
Roope Kakko (born 1982), Finnish golfer
Roope Kinnunen, stage name RoopeK, Finnish rapper
Roope Laavainen (born 1998), Finnish ice hockey player
Roope Latvala (born 1970), Finnish guitarist
Roope Nikkilä (born 1990), Finnish ice hockey player 
Roope Noronen (born 1974), president of American Football Association of Finland
Roope Ranta (born 1988), Finnish ice hockey player
Roope Riski (born 1991), Finnish footballer
Roope Salminen (born 1989), Finnish TV personality, singer and actor
Roope Suomalainen (born 1973), retired Finnish sailor
Roope Talaja (born 1988), Finnish ice hockey player
Roope Tonteri (born 1992), Finnish snowboarder

Surname
Fay Roope (1893–1961), American actor
Gerard Broadmead Roope (1905–1940), British Royal Navy officer awarded the Victoria Cross posthumously 
Graham Roope (1946–2006), English cricketer
Nicolas Roope (born 1972), British entrepreneur

References

See also
Roop (disambiguation)
Roopa
Rooper
Roper (disambiguation)

Finnish masculine given names
Surnames of English origin
Occupational surnames